Henry Murray (1893–1988) was an American psychologist.

Henry Murray may also refer to:

Henry Murray (Australian politician) (1844–1927)
Henry Murray (playwright), American playwright
Henry Murray (British politician) (1767–1805), Scottish soldier and administrator
Henry Murray (British Army officer) (1784–1850), English officer who fought in the Napoleonic Wars
Henry Leigh Murray (1820–1870), English actor
Henry Murray (athlete) (1886–1943), New Zealand athlete and architect
Henry Murray (VC), Australian recipient of the Victoria Cross
Henry Murray (taxidermist), British taxidermist

See also
Henry Murray-Anderdon (1848–1922), English cricket administrator
Harry Murray (disambiguation)